The 1966 Nippon Professional Baseball season was the 17th season of operation of Nippon Professional Baseball (NPB).

Regular season

Standings

League leaders

Central League

Pacific League

Awards
Most Valuable Player
Shigeo Nagashima, Yomiuri Giants (CL)
Katsuya Nomura, Nankai Hawks (PL)
Rookie of the Year
Tsuneo Horiuchi, Yomiuri Giants (CL)
No PL recipient
Eiji Sawamura Award
Minoru Murayama, Hanshin Tigers (CL) and Tsuneo Horiuchi, Yomiuri Giants (CL)

See also
1966 Major League Baseball season

References